XXX: State of the Union (Music from the Motion Picture) is the soundtrack to Lee Tamahori's 2005 action film XXX: State of the Union. It was released on April 26, 2005 via Jive Records, and consists of hip hop and alternative/hard rock music. The album peaked at #40 in New Zealand, #71 in Germany, #92 in Switzerland, and #117 in the United States. Its lead single "Get XXX'd" reached #95 on the Hot R&B/Hip-Hop Songs chart in the US.

Track listing

Notes
Track 5 contains a sample of "Remember (Walking in the Sand)" written by Shadow Morton and performed by The Shangri-Las
Track 6 does not appear in the film

Other songs
The following songs did appear in the film, but were not included in the soundtrack album
"As the World Turns", written by Tupac Shakur, Darrell "Big D" Harper, Mutah Beale, Rufus Cooper, Yafeu Fula, Malcolm Greenidge and Bruce Washington, and performed by Outlawz
"I Play You Lose", written by Dwayne Artess Morgan and Brian Yalskulka, and performed by the Grusomes and Tezz
"Victory", written by Tonči Huljić, and performed by Bond
"Two Sisters of Mystery", written by Neftali Santiago, and performed by Planet People Movement
"State of the Union", written by Julian Bunetta and Peter Bunetta, and performed by Peter Bunetta

Personnel
Chaz Harper – mastering
Nick Gamma – art direction
Mickey Wright – A&R direction

Charts

References

External links

XXX (film series)
2005 soundtrack albums
Hip hop soundtracks
Jive Records soundtracks
Albums produced by Lil Jon
Albums produced by Warren G
Albums produced by Timbaland
Alternative rock soundtracks
Albums produced by Josh Abraham
Albums produced by Jonathan Davis
Albums produced by Organized Noize
Albums produced by Gavin Brown (musician)
Action film soundtracks